Kenneth Joseph Thomas Harvey (born 22 January 1962) is a Canadian writer. His debut novel was The Town That Forgot How to Breathe.

Personal life
Harvey lives in St. John's, Newfoundland.

References

External links 
 

Writers from St. John's, Newfoundland and Labrador
1962 births
Living people
Canadian male novelists
Film directors from Newfoundland and Labrador